Hugh Miller (1802–1856) was a Scottish geologist and writer

Hugh Miller may also refer to:
Hugh Miller (Medal of Honor) (1859–?), American sailor and Medal of Honor recipient
Hugh Miller the younger (1850–1896), Scottish geologist
Hughie Miller (1886–1945), American baseball player
Hugh Miller (actor) (1889–1976), British film actor
Hugh Graham Miller (born 1939), British academic
Hugh B. Miller (1933–1978), American sailor
Hugh R. Miller (1812–1863), American politician
Hugh Thomas Miller (1867–1947), Lieutenant Governor of Indiana

See also
Hugh Millar (1921–1975), Canadian ice hockey player
Hughmilleria, an extinct genus of arthropod named after Hugh Miller (1802–1856)